Henry Tousley House is a historic home located at Logansport, Cass County, Indiana. It was built in 1885, and is a two-story, late Italianate style brick dwelling with Eastlake movement decorative elements.  It has an asymmetrical plan, a central hip roofed section with a projecting front wing, and one-story front porch added about 1910.

Henry Tousley was employed as a railroad official. The home was listed on the National Register of Historic Places in 2002.

References

Houses on the National Register of Historic Places in Indiana
Italianate architecture in Indiana
Houses completed in 1885
Houses in Cass County, Indiana
National Register of Historic Places in Cass County, Indiana
Logansport, Indiana